The Men's high jump B2 was a field event in athletics at the 1992 Summer Paralympics, for visually impaired athletes.

Results

Final

References 

Men's high jump B2